Battle for Rome may refer to:

 The title under which the series Ancient Rome: The Rise and Fall of an Empire was transmitted on the Discovery Channel
 One of the alternative names for what is now more commonly referred to as the Battle of Monte Cassino

See also

 Capture of Rome (1870) by the Kingdom of Sardinia
 Battle of Rome (disambiguation)
 Siege of Rome (disambiguation)
 Sack of Rome (disambiguation)
 Fall of Rome (disambiguation)
 Battle (disambiguation)
 Rome (disambiguation)